JinJu Patisserie is a bakery in Portland, Oregon.

Description 
The menu includes chocolates and other desserts (including seasonal specials such as cheesecake and pumpkin pie), croissants and pastries, and hot chocolate.

History 
The bakery opened on April 8, 2019.

Reception 

Michael Russell included JinJu in The Oregonian'''s 2019 overview of Portland's best croissants. Willamette Week included the bakery in a list of "12 things that didn't suck" about 2020. A food writer for the newspaper said, "For aficionados of laminated pastries, JinJu is a precious gem. The best known variation is the croissant, which at JinJu is dark, golden-baked, buttery perfection—if you can get your hands on one before they sell out. But the crown jewel of the lot is the weekend-only gianduja kouign amann, a carmelized sugar-encrusted, crown-shaped pastry with a center core of hazelnut-kissed chocolate cream. It is truly world class. Order it and you might forget for a moment that it's still 2020."

In 2021, Katherine Chew Hamilton included JinJu in Portland Monthly's list of "Our Top 6 Chocolate Croissants", and iHeart's Zuri Anderson included the bakery in an overview of Portland's best breakfast restaurants. Michelle Lopez included the bakery in Eater Portland'''s overview of "Where to Find Flaky, Crackly Croissants in Portland", and rooke Jackson-Glidden and Alex Frane included the bakery in an overview of "Where to Find a Real-Deal Breakfast in Portland". In the website's 2022 "Guide to Five Unforgettable Portland Pastries", Natalee Quinn and Jackson-Glidden wrote, "The Vegas tenure of patisserie power couple Kyurim Lee and Jin Caldwell shows in their sliver of a bakery: Every pastry in the case is gorgeous and meticulously constructed, from the heart-shaped yuzu bonbons to the shatteringly flaky croissants. Nothing beats the showstopper that is Jinju’s lemon-raspberry tart, a crown of toasted meringue surrounding a core of silken raspberry-lemon filling, cradled in a buttery pastry crust."

See also
 List of bakeries

References

External links 

 

2019 establishments in Oregon
Bakeries of Oregon
Boise, Portland, Oregon
North Portland, Oregon
Pâtisserie
Restaurants established in 2019
Restaurants in Portland, Oregon